USS SC-694 was a SC-497 class submarine chaser that served in the United States Navy during World War II.  She was laid down on 21 March 1942 by the Daytona Beach Boat Works in Daytona Beach, Florida, and launched on 25 May 1942.  She was commissioned on 9 September 1942.  She was bombed and sunk by German Ju 88 dive bombers off the coast of Palermo, Sicily, on 23 August 1943.

References
Submarine Chaser Photo Archive: SC-636
USS SC-636 (SC-636)

SC-497-class submarine chasers
Ships built in Florida
World War II shipwrecks in the Mediterranean Sea
1942 ships
Maritime incidents in August 1943
Ships sunk by German aircraft